Ellie May Darcey-Alden (born 4 September 1999) is an English-American actress. She is best known for playing young Lily Potter in Harry Potter and the Deathly Hallows – Part 2 and Francesca "Franny" Latimer in the Doctor Who series 7 Christmas special "The Snowmen". Before joining such large franchises as Harry Potter and Doctor Who, she appeared in minimal parts in British theatre and television. She has also done small-time modelling, commercials, voice over work and competitive dancing.

Early life

Darcey-Alden was born in Yarnton, Oxford, Oxfordshire to a middle-class family, the daughter of Sarah Dawn (née Darcey; b. 1975), a housewife, and Philip Rodney "Phil" Alden (b. 1966), a production senior director on Falcon 9 for SpaceX in Hawthorne, a former general manager at BMW Plant Automotive Group and technology manager at Jaguar Rover Automotive, and an owner of a charity website. Her father has a prominent political background through her paternal great-great-grandfather Leonard Henry Alden, Mayor of Oxford from 1936-37. Her parents legally wed in August 2003.

As a baby, her mother originally intended to name her "Annie" after the character Little Orphan Annie but decided against it, "as I'd probably be a curly red head!" Darcey-Alden explained.

She has a younger brother, Joseph (b. 18 February 2002) who is a former child actor and two older half-siblings, James Philip (b. 1990), a doctor at Colchester Hospital and Rebecca Charlotte "Becki" Alden (b. 1992), who is married, both from her father's first marriage.

She is a former pupil of Dance 10 Theatre School within Edward Feild Primary School in Kidlington which she attended from 2005 to 2011 and of Stagecoach Theatre Arts School under the instruction of Maya Sprigg in Oxford until 2013 where she moved to Elite Dance Studio in Los Angeles until 2015. In late August 2014, she began attending Palos Verdes High School and graduated on 7 June 2018. In Spring 2015 of her Freshman year, she joined her school's Choreo dance team, an advanced dance class that has students perform at pep rallies, community events, sporting events, and at their annual Spring Concert. She additionally divided her time with the drama department. In 2016, she joined the Be the Change leadership class as an admin assistant, dedicating her time to community services and events.

In July 2017, she joined the RADA Youth Company: Acting summer term, training under Trilby James in contemporary text and Shakespeare. In November 2018, she began youth acting classes with John Rosenfeld Studios in West Hollywood.

Career

2007–2009: Early work

Darcey-Alden made her acting debut in 2007, appearing in small roles on the British stage and television, including her first stage credit in Aladdin, directed by Peter Duncan for the Oxford Playhouse. At 7-years-old, she forged her parents' signature on a sign-up sheet which led to an audition. After the play's run, Duncan strongly recommended that she continue acting, directing her to film agents in London where she signed on with A&J Management. This was followed by an uncredited role in the 2008 mini-series Tess of the D'Urbervilles.

In 2009, she appeared in her first guest-starring role as Mary in one episode of Robin Hood and in select episodes as Emma Walker in Holby City—both for the BBC. She auditioned for the latter part earlier in June that year, accompanied by her mother, and was cast at the age of 9. Commenting on the experience, Darcey-Alden said: "It was very entertaining and a very good experience. I really, really enjoyed it. [Co-stars Jade Jackson and Patsy Kensit] were really nice, funny and entertaining. I want to be like Patsy Kensit when I am older because she is such a good actress. I am a big Holby City fan and I am really excited about seeing it on the television. All my friends and family are coming to watch it with me."

That year, she appeared in further stage credits, including Adrian Noble's musical production of Chitty Chitty Bang Bang for the New Theatre Oxford which was a revamped production of the original 2002 London production and the Mardi Gras Challenge, a UK dance competition at the Sadler's Wells Theatre.

She later commented at a 2013 LeakyCon panel in London on which form of media she preferred more—theatre, TV or film: "I love both. I actually started out doing theatre first and worked my way into TV and film. [...] I don't mind either, really. It's great!"

2009–2011: Harry Potter

Darcey-Alden's most notable role came in summer 2008 when she attended an open audition for the latest Harry Potter installment. It was not yet decided by the producers that the final book in the series would be split into two parts and once this decision was made, Darcey-Alden was expected to "re-audition over a year later" in December 2009 and "luckily still met the height and role requirements." She recalled: "I remember walking into the audition room, and I'd never seen so many other ginger kids in all my life. And even though I never expected much, I kept advancing through the audition rounds." On 25 January 2010, she was called back for a second audition at Pinewood Studios where she met director David Yates and worked with a number of other potentials for the parts of young James Potter, Sirius Black, Severus Snape and Lily Evans. During the process, the children were asked to improvise short conversations. She subsequently received a screen test with then 13-year-old Benedict Clarke (who would be cast as young Severus Snape) "as well as an associated costume, hair and makeup meeting" at Leavesden Studios, where she met then 21-year-old actor Daniel Radcliffe on her first day.

At a 2013 LeakyCon panel in Portland, Oregon, Darcey-Alden further elaborated on her meeting with Radcliffe. She said:  Radcliffe reportedly setup the meeting, knowing Darcey-Alden had booked the part even though she was unaware at the time.

A few weeks later in February, her mother was contacted by the producers and after school, Darcey-Alden was told that she received the part of young Lily Evans, cast at age 10, in the commercially successful Harry Potter and the Deathly Hallows – Part 2. She said: "I screamed, like I straight up screamed, then I cried. It's not something you expect; it's something you create [in your mind]. It's one of those things you go, 'Oh gosh, I wish I could do this. Like, how can I be able to do this?' And it's, like, one of my dreams [to be in Harry Potter], something that sits in the back of your head. And then, when it actually happens, it's really surreal." In the film, Darcey-Alden appears in a flashback sequence as Harry's mother in her schooldays and reveals how she befriended Snape as child, which is crucial in explaining the back story of the shady professor and his complex relationship to Harry's deceased parents, particularly his bitter resentment to his father James.

Although Darcey-Alden was tipped for future success by her agents at Enfield, London-based casting and theatrical agency A&J Management, her parents decided to not treat her passion for acting seriously until she was more mature. Despite this, she resisted her family for a chance in the business, especially for a part in Harry Potter, a role which her mother initially did not believe she would eventually win. When production began, she was not allowed to tell her close friends of her casting in Potter as she left school for Leavesden Studios and Hatfield House to film her scenes. She said: "I am still trying to get over that I am actually in Harry Potter. When I got the part, I was so happy I was speechless. It was the best time of my life. It was very funny. Everyone was so friendly to me and it was really fun. At first, it was really difficult to keep the secret. But when my friends did find out, they were so happy for me and supported me all the way through it."

Filming her scenes along with Benedict Clarke (young Snape), Ariella Paradise (young Petunia Dursley), Alfie McIlwain (young James) and Rohan Gotobed (young Sirius Black) took place in April 2010. Shooting only lasted four days where one scene was shot per day while re-shoots and pick-ups were completed in early 2011.

According to Darcey-Alden and Clarke at a 2013 LeakyCon cast junket in London, production alternated between sets at Leavesden Studios and on location shooting by the River Lea in the gardens of Hatfield Park near Hatfield House. Of the river scene in particular, Clarke elaborated by saying:  Darcey-Alden added: "We only did half-and-half at Leavesden. [...] There was the actual Hatfield House there and we got to have a look around and it was really beautiful."

Originally, it was planned for Darcey-Alden and Clarke to shoot a sequence on the reconstructed green screen set of King's Cross at Leavesden Studios with young Severus and Lily meeting inside the Hogwarts Express on their way to Hogwarts for the first time. Clarke was meant to call Darcey-Alden a "Mudblood" (much earlier than this occurs in Rowling's novels), leading to a rift between their characters and in their friendship. A Hogwarts Express scene does appear in the final shooting draft of the screenplay; however, no dialogue is present and most notable child characters, including Petunia, make an appearance along with Severus and Lily. Neither version was ultimately produced.

Once location shoots were completed, Darcey-Alden and Clarke joined McIlwain and Gotobed at Leavesden on the set of the Great Hall where the set was divided with one section of the Entrance Hall in ruins for the Battle of Hogwarts sequences; two days of shooting were completed from morning until evening, scheduled a week apart where three hours of school tutoring was provided. Darcey-Alden mentioned in a LeakyCon 2013 panel session that she worked with Dame Maggie Smith the first half of the day and was quoted, jokingly: "She spoke to me. It's not my fault."

She later said in detail: 

A week later, a final day of shooting commenced in the Hogwarts corridor where multiple takes had the four child actors walk and run up the corridor numerous times. The original cut had McIlwain and Gotobed chase a first year Slytherin student, though this detail was eventually omitted. "Though originally the scene was without dialogue," Gotobed revealed in a blog post, "I suggested to [David Yates] that I say 'Snivellus' as we pushed through Snape and Lily. David agreed that was a good idea, and even gave me a second line later on in the day, where I was supposed to say 'come on James' at the end of the brief scene. As you already know, both lines were cut for release in favour of [Radcliffe]'s voiceover [sic], which makes more sense in terms of the entire montage."

To satisfy the look of her character as described in the books, Darcey-Alden is naturally red-haired although she was required to wear blue contact lenses to match Daniel Radcliffe's eye colour, given her eyes are brown, as revealed by her co-star Benedict Clarke. Darcey-Alden herself later confirmed that she wore contacts in January 2015 when she was a special guest in a Harry Potter celebration at the Riverview Middle School in New Brunswick, Canada. Through a live Skype Q&A with a winning classroom, she said: 

Later, on 23 July 2015, she released a photo on Twitter of herself and Daniel Radcliffe posing on the set of Harry Potter to celebrate Radcliffe's 26th birthday, which further supported the fact that she had worn blue colour contacts. Darcey-Alden again stated in an interview on 1 December 2018 that she wore contacts for the entirety of shooting her scenes, saying, "I don't know what happened! People ask me this all the time!"

In the novels, Harry is described as having his mother's bright green, almond-shaped eyes, although Radcliffe never sported any colour-correcting contacts in the films due to a negative reaction to them; J.K. Rowling later commented on this by saying it was not an absolute need that Harry have green eyes in the films, as long as there was a resemblance between his and his mother's. However, the method of using blue contacts ultimately backfired and Darcey-Alden's natural eye colour showed through in the final footage. For an unknown reason, this error was not digitally corrected in post-production, though it could be because of producer David Heyman's dissatisfaction with past attempts.

When later asked by a fan of what it was like to be a part of a popular movie franchise, Darcey-Alden commented: "I'm not famous, people don't recognise me. I'm just a normal crazy 12 year old [sic] who was very lucky to be in such a huge film."

2012–2013: Later projects and break from acting

Darcey-Alden has since been cast in a variety of independent and larger budget films. It was announced on 20 July 2011 via the official A&J Management Twitter that she had been cast in a cameo role in Welcome to the Punch, a British thriller co-starring James McAvoy, Mark Strong and Harry Potter alum Peter Mullan. She appeared briefly in the aeroplane scene seated in the opposite aisle from Elyes Gabel. Other roles include two short films, Pranks, a children's ghost story following a 12-year-old orphan named Katie confronted by the spirit of her foster mother's dead son and Sam & Isobel, a coming of age tale of two young children brought together within the confines of a woodland through childlike innocence and naivety, although Sam eventually realises that Isobel is not as innocuous as she seems. Pranks co-starred her real life brother Joseph Darcey-Alden, was shot in four days on location at Cuckmans Farm, St Albans. The film was released to the public in April 2016. Sam & Isobel began filming on 9 April 2012 and wrapped production the following week on the 15th. The official teaser trailer was released online on 2 April 2013 by director Brendan Lyle. The film made its circuit at film festivals that year and in early 2014, it was officially released publicly online via Vimeo and YouTube by the production crew. One review called Darcey-Alden's performance, "ripened and complicated. [...] [F]rom the moment she begins to narrate her story, she sounds so sweetly young and yet so mature for a girl of 12 to 13 years of age, a maturity that is both engaged and a bit feverish. [...] Ultimately, this indication of maturity foreshadows who her character truly is, who may appear adorably innocent yet there's an edge of coldness beneath her given how she's not disturbed by many of her careless actions."

In 2012, she returned to the BBC for the Doctor Who series 7 Christmas special, "The Snowmen" as Francesca Latimer reuniting with real life brother Joseph Darcey-Alden as her on-screen sibling and co-starring alongside Jenna-Louise Coleman and Matt Smith. In the episode, set in London 1892, Francesca "Franny" Latimer and her brother Digby are wards being cared for by their governess Clara Oswin Oswald under the alias "Miss Montague". The children share a much closer relationship with Clara than they do their own father and Franny decides to relate a troubling experience to her: she has been having frequent nightmares of her late governess who has been tormenting her in her dreams of a promised return on Christmas Eve; it is revealed that years earlier, the governess drowned in the Latimers' pond, now frozen. Through a series of events, Franny's nightmare manifests under the Great Intelligence's influence, the Ice Governess is destroyed with the help of the Doctor, and Clara tragically succumbs to internal injuries, mourned by the Latimers.

At a Chicago TARDIS 2014 panel, Darcey-Alden revealed that it was her brother who secured her the role.

Joseph elaborated by saying: 

Ellie continued: "Couple of weeks after they were auditioning the sister role. So they were just doing the brothers and then they do the sisters after that. But we [...] just went in and we read together and we got a callback. The following couple of days after that, we got a callback and then it kind of went off with that."

The read-through took place on 2 August 2012 and was filmed later in BBC Wales' Roath Lock studios and Newport. To date, Darcey-Alden is the latest in a line of Harry Potter cast members to have appeared in both Potter and Doctor Who, including David Tennant, Michael Gambon, Helen McCrory, John Cleese, Zoe Wanamaker, Jim Broadbent, Toby Jones, Roger Lloyd Pack, Bill Nighy, Shirley Henderson, Adrian Rawlins, David Bradley, and John Hurt.

The same year, it was confirmed that she would guest star in the second season of Tom Fontana's French-German-Czech historical television drama Borgia: Faith and Fear (not to be confused with Showtime's The Borgias) as Felice della Rovere, on-screen and illegitimate daughter to Dejan Čukić's Cardinal Giuliano della Rovere (better known as Pope Julius II). Series two was shot on location in Prague and Italy in March through November 2012. Darcey-Alden filmed her scenes in Italy that October over the span of three days, sharing the screen alongside Matt Di'angelo and Mark Ryder. The show premiered on Canal+ on 18 March 2013 and Netflix on 1 May 2013.

Although Felice is considered a powerful and influential historical figure, Darcey-Alden's part in the show is reduced to a minimal appearance in the shadow of her powerful father; based on documentation, Felice was married as early as 14 and was widowed shortly after, years before she remarried Gian Giordano Orsini and subsequently became a prominent figure of the Italian Renaissance.

While Darcey-Alden filmed minimal scenes for episodes 11 and 12, they were eventually cut from the final version, yet her name still appears in the credits of the Season 2 DVD (Region 2). The show had been renewed for a third season, which was in principal photography as of May 2013; it was confirmed that this was the final of the series. At the time, it was currently unknown whether Darcey-Alden's character would return to the show, though since the airing of the finale in France on Canal+ on 27 October 2014, her character had been cut.

Stage credits included Ellen Kent's Aida Verdi for the New Theatre Oxford and The Nutcracker Twisted (or A Twisted Nutcracker), an interpretation of the original which breaks away from classic ballet and includes tap, hip-hop, jazz, singing and some "Gangnam Style." It was presented by Elite Dance Studio and performed at the Norris Theatre on 30 November 2013.

This would be her last foray into professional acting when she later revealed in January 2016 to Live From 205 News that her professional acting career was temporarily on hold, commenting that, "Hollywood does not like a 16-year-old girl with braces. Next year when I get my braces off, I'll be out to start auditioning again."

2014-present: Amateur theatre, competitive dancing and upcoming projects

On 23–26 May 2014, she appeared in the Showstopper! Competition which took place at the Disneyland Hotel in California. She competed in a ballet solo, ballet group, jazz group and contemporary group. She and her group were later awarded two Platinum 1st Place prizes with scores of 114.2 and 114.0, respectively for their performances "Stranded" and "Hold It Against Me" presented by Elite Dance Studio.

On 6–8 February 2015, she appeared in the KAR: Kids Artistic Revue Long Beach, CA Competition, which took place at Millikan High School.

She additionally performed in the Palos Verdes High School Choreo Show 2015 and returned for 2016, which was held at the James R. Armstrong Theatre in Torrance from 23–24 March.

She worked for the first time behind the scenes as a British English dialect coach for Palos Verdes High School's production of Noises Off, performed from 6-8, 12–15 November 2015.

She was cast in Palos Verdes High School's production of Joseph and the Amazing Technicolor Dreamcoat, directed by Nicole Thompson as the Female Ensemble which was performed from 15-17, 21–24 April 2016. The musical was later nominated for 15 John Raitt Awards for Youth, including Best Ensemble and took home one for Musical Comedy of the Year.

In August 2018, she was cast as the recurring character Alice in the British drama action television series Remnants, directed and written by Luke Heaver and Kieran Thomas Peace. It is set for production in 2019.

In March 2019, it was announced that she would be joining the cast of the thriller crime series How to Identify a Serial Killer as the supporting character Harriett. Starring Australian actress Karlisha Hurley and directed by Kristine May, it is set for production later this year.

Other work

Outside of screen and stage credits, she modelled small-time, including ads for Morleys Stores ca. 2009-10, Playworld Systems, Nestle, Sodexo, Marks & Spencer, and McCarthy & Stone, and was a front page model for the British children and pre-teen magazine Girl Talk in 2012 and 2013. In January 2011, she appeared in a commercial for Skype.

Studio Tour London: The Making of Harry Potter in October 2012, LeakyCon Portland 2013, LeakyCon London 2013 and Misti-Con 2013 in Laconia, New Hampshire. In December 2012, she along with Potter alum Ryan Turner (Hugo Weasley) participated in the Leighton Christmas Festival.

On 21 December 2013, she performed for the Los Angeles Clippers halftime show with Elite Dance Studio.

She was scheduled to appear as a guest at Gallifrey One 2014, a science fiction and Doctor Who fan convention, which took place 14–16 February at the Los Angeles Airport Marriott. It was announced that she would be returning to LeakyCon 2014, which took place in Orlando, Florida from 30 July to 3 August and played Hermione Granger in the Opening Ceremony. She and her brother Joseph appeared as guests at the Midwest's Premier Doctor Who event, Chicago TARDIS 2014 from 28–30 November at the Westin Lombard Yorktwon Center. In January 2015, she was invited as a special guest in a Harry Potter celebration at the Riverview Middle School in New Brunswick, Canada through Skype. She and her brother were scheduled to appear as guests at the Twin Cities' premier Doctor Who convention, CONsole Room 2015 which took place from 29–31 May at the Hilton Minneapolis/St. Paul Airport. On 6 April 2016, she visited The Wizarding World of Harry Potter Opening at Universal Studios Hollywood on behalf of MuggleNet where she interviewed Harry Potter co-stars Tom Felton, James and Oliver Phelps, Evanna Lynch and Warwick Davis as well as art director Alan Gilmore.

Personal life

She moved to the United States with her immediate family on 8 February 2013 when she was 13 years old. She now currently resides in Los Angeles in the city of Rancho Palos Verdes.

She is also a big fan of Muggle Quidditch, and was taught to play by members of the five National teams that participated in the 2012 IQA Summer Games (United Kingdom, Australia, France, and the United States). She commented to CNN: "I think [Muggle Quidditch is] brilliant, it's really funny to watch! I didn't realise it was so rough and tough and it's great to just have a go!"

In September 2018, Darcey-Alden was diagnosed for the second time with a breast mass, undergoing immediate surgery. She has since made a full recovery.

She and her brother Joseph Darcy-Alden became U.S. citizens in early November 2022.

Filmography

Film and television

Theatre

Awards and nominations

References

Notes
McCabe, Bob. Harry Potter Page to Screen: The Complete Filmmaking Journey. First Ed. New York, NY: Harper Design, 2011. Print. .
Riley, Mark, and Marios Chirtou. The Craft of the Cut: The Final Cut Pro X Editor's Handbook. West Sussex: Wiley, 2012. Print. .

External links

Ellie Darcey-Alden Agency Page at A&J Management
Ellie Darcey-Alden at Pranks Media

Living people
1999 births
21st-century English actresses
Actresses from Oxfordshire
British emigrants to the United States
British expatriate actresses in the United States
English child actresses
English film actresses
English television actresses
People from Cherwell District
People with acquired American citizenship